Michal Češka (born 2 September 1992) is a Czech ice dancer. With partner Cortney Mansour, he has won three international medals and reached the free skate at three ISU Championships.

Personal life 
Michal Češka was born on 2 September 1992 in Děčín. His father is a former figure skater. His younger brother plays ice hockey.

Early career 
Češka began skating at age four and switched from singles to ice dancing when he was about fifteen. He began competing with Karolína Procházková in 2007. In 2010, they were selected for their first World Junior Championships and finished 26th at the event in The Hague, Netherlands.

Procházková/Češka's luggage containing their skates did not arrive in time at the 2011 Junior Worlds in Gangneung, South Korea, forcing them to withdraw. They placed 21st at the 2012 World Junior Championships in Minsk, Belarus and 23rd at the 2013 World Junior Championships in Milan, Italy. They were coached by Rostislav Sinicyn and Natalia Karamysheva in Prague.

Partnership with Mansour

2013–14 season 
In mid-2013, Češka teamed up with Canada's Cortney Mansour to compete for the Czech Republic, following a tryout in Europe. They were coached by Carol Lane, John Lane, and Juris Razgulajevs in Toronto, Ontario, Canada. Making their international debut, Mansour/Češka placed 12th at a Junior Grand Prix (JGP) event in Gdańsk in September 2013 and tenth the following month at JGP Ostrava in the Czech Republic. The duo finished 13th at the 2014 World Junior Championships in Sofia, Bulgaria, after placing 14th in both segments.

2014–15 season: Senior debut 
Mansour/Češka advanced to the senior level in the 2014–15 season. Competing in the Challenger Series, they placed ninth at the 2014 CS Nebelhorn Trophy and tenth at the 2014 CS Skate Canada Autumn Classic. Ranked 19th in the short dance and 15th in the free, they finished 17th at the 2015 European Championships in Stockholm, Sweden.

2015–16 season 
Mansour/Češka placed sixth at two Challenger Series events in the first half of October, the 2015 CS Ondrej Nepela Trophy and 2015 CS Finlandia Trophy. Deciding to change coaches, they joined Igor Shpilband in Novi, Michigan at the end of the month. The duo won gold at the Pavel Roman Memorial and then finished 13th at the 2016 European Championships in Bratislava after placing 14th in the short and 13th in the free. Ranked 24th in the short, they did not qualify for the free dance at the 2016 World Championships.

2016–17 season: Grand Prix debut 
In July 2016, Mansour/Češka received their first Grand Prix assignment, replacing Federica Testa / Lukas Csolley at the 2016 Trophée de France.

Programs

With Mansour

With Procházková

Results 
GP: Grand Prix; CS: Challenger Series; JGP: Junior Grand Prix

With Mansour

With Procházková

References

External links 

 
 

1992 births
Czech male ice dancers
Living people
People from Děčín
Figure skaters at the 2018 Winter Olympics
Olympic figure skaters of the Czech Republic